Diatoma is a genus of diatoms belonging to the family Fragilariaceae.

The genus has cosmopolitan distribution.

Species:

Diatoma angusticostata 
Diatoma arcuatum 
Diatoma auritum

References

Diatoms
Diatom genera